The Ministry of Women and Vulnerable Populations of Peru is the government ministry in charge of national policy in favor of women and vulnerable populations. Its headquarters is located in Lima, Peru. , the minister is Grecia Rojas Ortiz.

History
The ministry was created on October 29, 1996 and was originally named Ministry of the Promotion of Women and of Human Development. In 2002 it was renamed as Ministry of Women and Social Development. In 2012, it received its current name.

Mission
The mission of the ministry is to lead and regulate the policies of its sector. It seeks to promote decentralization and contribute to the eradication of poverty, inequality, and exclusion, and is oriented towards individuals living in poverty and to other vulnerable groups. It focuses on comprehensive human development, equality, and to generate equal opportunity between men and women.

External links
Official Website of the Ministry of Women and Vulnerable Populations

Women and Social Development
Peru, Women and Social Development
Peru
Women in Peru
1996 establishments in Peru